Amphipneustes mironovi is a species of sea urchin of the family Temnopleuridae. Their armour is covered with spines. It is placed in the genus Amphipneustes and lives in the sea. Amphipneustes mironovi was first scientifically described in 1991 by Markov.

See also 
Amphipneustes koehleri (Mortensen, 1905)
Amphipneustes marsupialis (Markov, 1991)
Amphipneustes rostratus (Koehler, 1926)

References 

Amphipneustes
Animals described in 1991